Michael Kohn (born May 26, 1972) is an American former bobsledder who has competed since 1990. Competing in two Winter Olympics, he won a bronze medal in the four-man event at Salt Lake City in 2002 as a push athlete for pilot Brian Shimer.

He also won a silver medal in the mixed bobsleigh-skeleton team event at the 2007 FIBT World Championships in St. Moritz.

Kohn retired from competition after the 2010 Winter Olympics. He was appointed as an assistant coach by the United States Bobsled and Skeleton Federation in 2011.

Kohn is also an Infantry Captain in the United States Army. A native of Columbia, South Carolina, he now lives in Myrtle Beach, South Carolina with his wife Jessica, and two sons, Oliver and Max Kohn.

References

 CNN Sports Illustrated profile of 2002 US bobsled team
 Announcement of the US Olympic men's bobsleigh team. U.S. Bobsleigh and Skeleton Federation. January 17, 2010. Accessed 18 January 18, 2010.
 Bobsleigh four-man Olympic medalists for 1924, 1932–56, and since 1964

External links

 
 
 
 

1972 births
American male bobsledders
Bobsledders at the 2002 Winter Olympics
Bobsledders at the 2010 Winter Olympics
Olympic bronze medalists for the United States in bobsleigh
Living people
Sportspeople from Columbia, South Carolina
Sportspeople from Fairfax County, Virginia
United States Army soldiers
Medalists at the 2002 Winter Olympics
American sports coaches
Sports coaches from South Carolina
Chantilly High School alumni
U.S. Army World Class Athlete Program